Rocky Mountaineer Station in Vancouver, British Columbia, Canada, is a railway station which acts as the western terminus of the Rocky Mountaineer train service to Jasper, Banff and Calgary.  Prior to 2005, the Vancouver terminus for the Rocky Mountaineer was the Pacific Central Station.

The station was originally built for Canadian National Railway as a locomotive repair shed.  At a cost of $4M CDN, the building was renovated by Rocky Mountaineer Rail Tours into a railway station, with the first train departing on April 17, 2005.

In February 2010, the east and west facades were updated with large signage identifying this structure as 'Alberta Station,' replacing the words 'Rocky Mountaineer Station.'  The building reverted to its 'Rocky Mountaineer' signs the first week of March 2010.  The temporary signage change was related to the government of Alberta leasing a Rocky Mountaineer train for the 2010 Winter Olympics in Vancouver.

References

Buildings and structures in Vancouver
Transport in Greater Vancouver
Railway stations in Canada opened in 2005
Rocky Mountaineer stations in British Columbia
Transport infrastructure completed in 1954